The Pittsburgh City Paper is Pittsburgh's leading alternative weekly newspaper which focuses on local news, opinion, and arts and entertainment. It bought out In Pittsburgh Weekly in 2001. As of April 2015, City Paper is the 14th largest (by circulation) alternative weekly in the United States.

History 
The Pittsburgh City Paper is a free publication and is distributed in most neighborhoods throughout the Greater Pittsburgh area every Wednesday, with about 70,000 copies printed weekly.

The City Paper was originally based in Duquesne, Pennsylvania. Like most alternative weeklies, the publication tended toward a left-wing viewpoint. Pittsburgh City Papers slogan is "All Paper, No Plastic."

The Pittsburgh City Paper is locally owned and has no business relationship with other City Papers found in other cities such as the Washington City Paper and Philadelphia City Paper. In 2016, Steel City Media sold the City Paper to the owners of the Butler Eagle.

On May 15, 2018, City Paper terminated editor Charlie Deitch following pressure from City Paper and Butler Eagle publisher Butler Color Press after a disagreement over coverage of controversial Pennsylvania state representative Daryl Metcalfe. Deitch would go on to found the direct competitor, Pittsburgh Current, as a result.

Awards and recognition 

In 2010, the CP news staff won 10 awards out of 11 nominations from the Press Club in western Pennsylvania. Individual winners included Charlie Deitch for Business Writing, Chris Young in Health and Medical reporting, Chris Potter for Columns and Bill O'Driscoll for Best Feature and Science and Technology writing. The news staff also won an award for its coverage of the 2009 G-20 Summit in Pittsburgh.

Since 2010, City Paper staff writers have won more than two-dozen awards for journalism. Editor Charlie Deitch has won 16 Golden Quill Awards from the Press Club of Western Pennsylvania, including two Ray Sprigle Memorial Awards for best-in-show. Between 2015-2017, News Editor Rebecca Addison has won three consecutive Sprigle Awards. Staff Writer Ryan Deto was the co-winner of the 2016 Sprigle award and in 2017 he was recognized for excellence in race reporting by the Association of Alternative Newsweeklies for his coverage of detention and eventual deportation of a local community leader.

See also 

Eagle Media Corp.

References

External links
 

Alternative weekly newspapers published in the United States
Newspapers published in Pittsburgh